East Alton is a village in Madison County, Illinois, United States. The population was 5,786 at the 2020 census, down from 6,301 in 2010.

History
East Alton was incorporated as a village in 1893 (some say 1894).

William Cobb, namesake of Cobb Street, was one of the first mayors, from 1895 to 1896, and again in 1902–1905.

Like many River Bend communities, the town dates back to when European settlers came to the area in the early 19th century. And it wasn't always East Alton — the community was known as Emerald, Milton Settlement and Alton Junction. Alton Junction was also known as Wann Junction, famous locally for being the site of a horrific rail disaster.

Geography
East Alton is located in northwestern Madison County at  (38.883397, -90.106113). It is bordered to the northwest by the city of Alton, to the east by unincorporated Rosewood Heights, to the southeast by the city of Wood River, and to the southwest by the Mississippi River, with West Alton, Missouri, on the opposite shore.

The Wood River flows through the northern and western parts of the village and forms the village's western border (with Alton) for some of its distance. The river joins the Mississippi in the southern part of the village.

Illinois Route 3 (Lewis and Clark Boulevard) passes through the southwest part of the village, leading northwest into Alton and south  to East St. Louis. Illinois Route 143 (Berm Highway) follows the Mississippi along the village's southern edge, leading northwest to the center of Alton and east to the center of Wood River. Illinois Routes 111 and 140 run together along the northern border of the village, leading west into Alton and east into Bethalto.

Demographics

As of the census of 2000, there were 6,830 people, 2,965 households, and 1,787 families residing in the village. The racial makeup of the village was 96.72% White, 0.94% African American, 0.25% Native American, 0.38% Asian, 0.01% Pacific Islander, 0.18% from other races, and 1.52% from two or more races. Hispanic or Latino of any race were 1.02% of the population.

There were 2,965 households, out of which 30.1% had children under the age of 18 living with them, 41.3% were married couples living together, 14.3% had a female householder with no husband present, and 39.7% were non-families. 35.0% of all households were made up of individuals, and 17.0% had someone living alone who was 65 years of age or older. The average household size was 2.30 and the average family size was 2.95.

In the village, the population was spread out, with 25.2% under the age of 18, 8.9% from 18 to 24, 28.8% from 25 to 44, 20.6% from 45 to 64, and 16.6% who were 65 years of age or older. The median age was 36 years. For every 100 females, there were 91.6 males. For every 100 females age 18 and over, there were 87.1 males.

The median income for a household in the village was $28,404, and the median income for a family was $35,655. Males had a median income of $36,770 versus $20,865 for females. The per capita income for the village was $15,572. About 7.8% of families and 13.3% of the population were below the poverty line, including 18.9% of those under age 18 and 8.0% of those age 65 or over.

Industry
East Alton is home to the Olin Corporation, a manufacturer of ammunition. Olin has a major impact on East Alton and its surrounding communities. A part of town called the Defense Area was built during the 1940s and until recently was used for low income housing. Replacing the Defense Area is Emerald Ridge, which was to be completed in early 2015 and would consist of 46 new single-family homes. The impact of Olin has spread into town sports: East Alton Middle School's athletic teams were originally the Bullets.

Points of interest
East Alton is located in the Greater Metropolitan area of St. Louis, Missouri. Thus, all the attractions and facilities of that major city are equally available to residents of East Alton and nearby communities. Additionally, East Alton is minutes away from the origination point of the Journey of Discovery (Lewis and Clark Expedition) located in nearby Hartford, Illinois. Educational institutions in the area include Southern Illinois University Edwardsville, the SIUE Dental School in Alton, Principia College in Elsah and  Lewis and Clark Community College in Godfrey.

Van Preter Park is the main park in East Alton. This  park consists of four baseball diamonds, two playground units, two small pavilions and one large pavilion.

Bill Tite Memorial - Lions Park is located on the north side of the Keasler Recreation Complex.  The entrance is in the 300 block of Ohio Street. This park consists of a large playground unit, two swing set units with toddler seats, a climbing unit, see-saw rider, two large multiple play stations, picnic tables, park benches, barbecue grills, and green space. The park will undergo improvements beginning late 2015.

The East Alton Post Office contains a mural, The Letter, painted in 1937 by Frances Foy. Murals were produced from 1934 to 1943 in the United States through the Section of Painting and Sculpture, later called the Section of Fine Arts, of the Treasury Department.

The East Alton History Museum officially opened on March 4, 2017, and is located in the Fred H. Bright Jr. Vital Services Building, 119 N. Main Street. The building, which houses the East Alton Police department, was renamed the same day in honor of the former Mayor.

Notable people 

 Joe Astroth, catcher for the Athletics when they were based in Philadelphia and Kansas City
 Fred Olsen invented the ball propellant manufacturing process here.

See also
 Melvin Price Locks and Dam on the Mississippi River at East Alton

References

External links

Villages in Madison County, Illinois
Villages in Illinois
Illinois populated places on the Mississippi River